Richard Thomas Orlando Bridgeman, 7th Earl of Bradford (born 3 October 1947), styled Viscount Newport from 1957 to 1981, is a British peer and businessman.

Background and education
Bradford is the son of Gerald Bridgeman, 6th Earl of Bradford, and Mary Willoughby Montgomery. He was educated at St. Ronan's School, Hawkhurst, and Harrow School, just outside London, and Trinity College, Cambridge, where he graduated with a Bachelor of Arts in 1969 and a Master of Arts in 1973. He succeeded to his father's title in 1981.

Career
In 1979, Bradford opened Porters English Restaurant in London's Covent Garden. He later opened the Covent Garden Grill next door. In January 2015 the restaurants closed as the landlord would not extend the lease and Bradford moved his business to Hertfordshire, where he opened Porters Restaurant in Berkhamsted. The restaurant closed on 30 September 2018.

From 1986 to 1999 he was Chairman of Weston Park Enterprises. Because the 6th Earl left the family with large death duties, Bradford gifted his home Weston Park and 1,000 acres to the nation in 1986, with the support of the National Heritage Memorial Fund, to the Weston Park Foundation. 
As of 1998, he is Chairman of VIP Internet Ltd, a website design company, which also operates its own websites, such as Stately-Homes.com, now sold, and A-London-Guide.com.

In the 2001 general election, he was a candidate for parliament in the House of Commons, running as a candidate for the UK Independence Party, obtaining 5.2% support (2,315 votes) in Stafford, losing to David Kidney, but achieving the 4th best result for the party. He ran again for UKIP in the European Elections for the West Midlands region in 2004, coming eighth, seven candidates were elected. In May 2012 he stood unsuccessfully for the party in a by election in the Hyde Park ward of Westminster City Council, with the support of celebrity nightclub-owner Peter Stringfellow.

Lord Bradford is an active campaigner against the sale of false titles of nobility. Bradford has alleged that he has been subjected to an online smear campaign in retaliation for his campaign, with unfavourable reviews being posted on TripAdvisor and the appearance of fraudulent review websites.

Family
On 15 September 1979, he married Joanne Elizabeth Miller, elder daughter of Mayfair bookmaker Benjamin Miller. They divorced in 2006. They have four children.

Works
My Private Parts and The Stuffed Parrot (1984)
The Eccentric Cookbook (1985)
Stately Secrets (1994)
Porters English Cookery Bible – Ancient and Modern, with Carol Wilson (2004)
Porters Seasonal Celebrations Cookbook, with Carol Wilson (2007)

Notes

External links

Porters English Restaurant
Fake Titles – a website run by Lord Bradford
VIP Internet website
Stately Homes website
Restaurant Guide website

1947 births
Living people
People educated at Harrow School
Alumni of Trinity College, Cambridge
7
UK Independence Party parliamentary candidates
Richard
Conservative Party (UK) hereditary peers
UK Independence Party hereditary peers
Bradford